Brodie Holland (born 3 January 1980) is a former professional Australian rules footballer and model best known for his playing days at the Collingwood Football Club in the Australian Football League.

Brodie Holland is also known for his media profile, particularly due to some notable on-field and off-field incidents involving him.

Early life
From Tasmania, where he attended St Virgil's College, Brodie was drafted to Fremantle in the 1997 AFL Draft at no.26 overall.

AFL career
He made his debut mid-way through 1998 as a small-forward and played most games since making his first appearance. He spent a further 2 seasons at the Dockers before being traded to Collingwood in 2000. Holland quickly adapted as a good player with the Magpies and became a fan favourite in his first season, kicking 28 goals in 21 matches.

In 2002 he started off with a 3-goal haul against Richmond and then produced an 8-goal haul a week later against the West Coast Eagles, to be the leading goalkicker for the season after round 2. He then was quiet for the rest of the season. He injured his back, causing a month out of the game, but could not get back in the side until late season. He was dropped after round 22 and missed the Magpies first finals campaign since 1994, which included playing in the 2002 AFL Grand Final. 2003 saw him change to a tagging role in the midfield rather than the inconsistent goal-kicking small forward. He had a clash with Scott Camporeale of Carlton leaving him with a bloodied nose, while late in the year, he was suspended for punching Paul Williams of Sydney in the stomach. He missed the first final but managed to get back in for the Preliminary and Grand Final sides.

He continued as a tagging midfielder, despite some problems at the tribunal during years 2004 and 2005, and his good form bought him very close to winning the Copeland Trophy, coming second to James Clement in 2005.

While he could not retain his 2005 form, he continued to be a fan favourite in 2006, showing grit and determination to win the ball, highlighted in a match against the Geelong Football Club, in which he bravely laid a huge tackle on Geelong big man Cameron Mooney.

In the Elimination Final against the Western Bulldogs, Holland was suspended for 6 weeks for rough conduct against Brett Montgomery.

After playing just 1 game in 2008 due to injury, Holland was delisted by Collingwood. He was hopeful of continuing his career at another AFL club but was not picked up, he then retired.

Suburban football
After being delisted by Collingwood he took up a suburban football in the Essendon District Football League with the Maribyrnong Park Football Club where he had become captain-coach, however he was banned after striking a young opponent from the Doutta Stars. Holland has been deregistered from the Essendon league when it was found that on a technicality, Holland is not eligible to play in the league. The regulations of AFL Victoria, the sport's governing body, say that a player who has served more than 16 weeks' suspension in one competition cannot transfer to another. Holland was outed for more than 16 games during his 11-year career at the top level with Fremantle and Collingwood. Despite not being able to play, he has been allowed to continue to coach if he chooses.

Holland appealed this decision and was allowed to continue as playing coach. On 13 Sep 2009 the Maribyrnong Park Lions won the EDFL A Grade Grand Final – Maribyrnong Park 102 def Greenvale 84.

In 2010, Maribyrnong Park finished 4th at the end of the home and away season. They went on to defeat 3rd placed Oak Park then 2nd placed Keilor to advance to the Grand Final against Greenvale.
On 12 Sep 2010, in a back to back as playing coach, Holland led the Maribyrnong Park A Grade Seniors team to victory - Maribyrnong Park 90 def Greenvale 73.

In 2015, Holland left heading north to play for the Broadford Football Netball Club in the Riddel District Football League. Holland was a pivotal player in Broadford making the finals for the first time since rejoining the RDFL.

Media profile
In 2005, Holland participated in the Seven Network's television show Dancing with the Stars with dance partner Alana. Holland made it to the top four before being voted off the show.

In 2006, Holland appeared in several advertisements on television for a lottery advertisement along with the NRL's Matthew Johns.  He also made a cameo appearance as himself in the soap opera Neighbours.

Holland also made several appearances as a panellist on the AFL Footy Show.

References

External links

Brodie Holland at the Collingwood Football Club website 

1980 births
Living people
Collingwood Football Club players
Fremantle Football Club players
Tassie Mariners players
Tasmanian Football Hall of Fame inductees
People educated at St Virgil's College
East Perth Football Club players
South Fremantle Football Club players
Glenorchy Football Club players
Australian rules footballers from Hobart